CTN Midnite is a defunct late night news program of IBC 13 in the Philippines. which was aired from July 10, 1995, to July 10, 1998, replacing IBC News 11 O'Clock Report and was replaced by IBC Balita Ngayon. CTN stood for Channel Thirteen News.

Anchors
 Karen Bayhon (1995–1997)
 Alice Noel (1995–1998)
 Amelyn Veloso (1995–1998)
 Bernadette Sembrano (1997-1998)
 Anne Marie Soriano (1995-1997)

See also
List of programs previously broadcast by Intercontinental Broadcasting Corporation
IBC News and Public Affairs

Philippine television news shows
1990s Philippine television series
1995 Philippine television series debuts
1998 Philippine television series endings
English-language television shows
IBC News and Public Affairs
Intercontinental Broadcasting Corporation original programming
Intercontinental Broadcasting Corporation news shows